Acute Bank is a bank in the Geelvink Channel east of South Passage in the Houtman Abrolhos, in the Indian Ocean off the coast of Western Australia.

References

Geelvink Channel